North Shore, Australia may refer to:

North Shore (Sydney)
North Shore, Victoria